The 2011 season was the St. Louis Rams' 74th in the National Football League, their 17th in St. Louis, and their third and final season under head coach Steve Spagnuolo. They finished with a 2–14 record – a failure to improve on their 7–9 record from 2010 – and the day after the season finale, head coach Steve Spagnuolo and general manager Billy Devaney were fired from the team.

The Rams' offense was among the worst in the league in 2011. They scored only 193 points (12.1 points per game), last in the league, and 11th-fewest all-time for a 16-game season. Their −214-point differential was last in the league.

Football Outsiders ranked St. Louis the worst team in the league, per play, in 2011. The 2012 Football Outsiders Almanac, however, noted that the Rams went from the league's easiest schedule in 2010 to the league's hardest schedule in 2011.

With their 2–14 record, the Rams capped a stretch from 2007 to 2011 in which they went 15–65, setting a new mark for the worst five-season span in NFL history. This mark has since been matched by the Cleveland Browns of 2013 to 2017. To date, this is the last season with the Rams getting, at most, two victories. As of 2022, the 2011 Rams are the most recent team to score less than 200 points the entire season.

Offseason

Coaching changes
On January 18, the Rams hired former Denver Broncos' head coach Josh McDaniels as the team's new offensive coordinator, replacing Pat Shurmur, who became the new head coach of the Cleveland Browns five days earlier (January 13).

Draft

 The Rams traded its sixth-round selection (#145 overall) to the Atlanta Falcons in exchange for the Falcons' sixth-round selection (#158 overall) and their seventh-round selection (#229 overall).
 The Rams traded its sixth-round selection (#180 overall) to the Baltimore Ravens in exchange for the Ravens' seventh-round selection (#228 overall) and WR Mark Clayton.

Staff

Final roster

Preseason

Schedule
The Rams' preseason schedule was announced on April 12, 2011.

Regular season

Schedule

Game summaries

Week 1: vs. Philadelphia Eagles

With the loss, the Rams started the season 0–1.

Week 2: at New York Giants

With the loss, the Rams fell to 0–2.

Week 3: vs. Baltimore Ravens

With the loss, the Rams fell to 0–3.

Week 4: vs. Washington Redskins

With the loss, the Rams went into their bye week at 0–4.

Week 6: at Green Bay Packers

Coming off of their bye week in week 5, the Rams traveled to Lambeau Field to take on the undefeated Packers.  The loss dropped the team to 0–5.

Week 7: at Dallas Cowboys

With the loss, the Rams dropped to 0–6.

Week 8: vs. New Orleans Saints

This home game for the team also had a celebration of the St. Louis Cardinals showing off the World Series trophy.  The Rams would then go on to win this game and improve to 1–6.

Week 9: at Arizona Cardinals

The game featured the Rams' scoring the four points in the third quarter as they got two safeties on consecutive drives. This was first time in NFL history that a team had recorded four points in a quarter.

With the loss, the Rams fell to 1–7 and last place in the NFC West.

Week 10: at Cleveland Browns

With the close win, the Rams improved to 2–7.

Week 11: vs. Seattle Seahawks

With the loss, the Rams dropped to 2–8.

Week 12: vs. Arizona Cardinals

With the loss, the Rams dropped to 2–9 securing them their 5th straight losing season.

Week 13: at San Francisco 49ers

With the loss, the Rams fell to 2–10.

Week 14: at Seattle Seahawks

With the loss, the Rams fell to 2–11 and were swept by the Seahawks for the first time since 2009.

Week 15: vs. Cincinnati Bengals

With the loss, the Rams fell to 2–12.

Week 16: at Pittsburgh Steelers

This game became the Steelers' 2nd shutout win of the season as the Rams dropped to 2–13.

Week 17: vs. San Francisco 49ers

With the loss, the Rams finished the season at 2–14 tied with the Colts for the league's worst record.

Standings

Notes and references

St. Louis
St. Louis Rams seasons
St Louis